East Adelaide was an electoral district of the South Australian Legislative Council from 1851 to 1857 and an electoral district of the South Australian House of Assembly from 1862 to 1902.

First incarnation
East Adelaide was a seat of the unicameral South Australian Legislative Council from 1851 until that council's abolition in 1857. Francis Stacker Dutton was the elected member for the duration.

Second incarnation
The lower house electoral district was created when the Electoral district of City of Adelaide was abolished in 1862 and East Adelaide and Electoral district of West Adelaide created. The district of Adelaide was ultimately recreated in 1902 by the recombination of East Adelaide and West Adelaide.

The electorate was created by the Electoral Districts Act (No. 20) of the South Australian parliament in 1861 but it was not until the state election of 1862 election that candidates were first elected to represent East Adelaide. The electorate at its creation included all of the City of Adelaide (South Adelaide, North Adelaide and the Adelaide parklands) east of the centres of King William Street, Poole street, John Street and O'Connell Street.

In 1872 the area of the electorate shrunk when the Electoral district of North Adelaide was created by excising those parts of East and West Adelaide south of the River Torrens.

Successful 1891 Wallaroo by-election candidate Richard Hooper was the first Labor member of the House of Assembly, but was not a member of the newly formed United Labor Party (ULP), instead serving as an Independent Labor member. The 1892 East Adelaide by-election saw ULP candidate John McPherson win the seat. It was the first time the ULP had won a seat in the House of Assembly, with electoral success to be followed at the 1893 colonial election, winning 10 of 54 seats and the balance of power, allowing the ULP to support the liberal opposition led by Charles Kingston in defeating the conservative government led by John Downer.

Members

References

Former Members of the Parliament of South Australia

Former electoral districts of South Australia
1862 establishments in Australia
1902 disestablishments in Australia